Heart-Shaped Scar is the debut studio album by American singer LP, released in 2001.

Reception
Allmusic reviewed the album positively, grading it with four stars out of five. Thom Jurek, who reviewed the album noted: "LP's debut, Heart-Shaped Scar, is a roaring, snotty, bratty, bad-ass pop/rock record full of killer riffs, crunching guitars, and LP's voice, which is equal parts Maggie Bell, Pat Benatar, and Robert Plant ground like glass through a deep Rolling Stones, Bad Company, Lynyrd Skynyrd, blues-rock, and biker sensibility."

Track listing

References

External links
 Listen to the album

2001 debut albums
LP (singer) albums